The following outline is provided as an overview of and topical guide to Mexico:

The United Mexican States, commonly known as Mexico, is a federal constitutional republic located in North America. Mexico is bound on the north by the United States; on the south and west by the North Pacific Ocean; on the southeast by Guatemala, Belize, and the Caribbean Sea; and on the east by the Gulf of Mexico.

General reference 

 Pronunciation: 
 
 Common English country name: Mexico
 Official English country name: United Mexican States
 Common endonym: México
 Official endonym: Estados Unidos Mexicanos
 Adjectival: Mexican
 Demonym(s):
 Etymology: Name of Mexico
 International rankings of Mexico
 Area and size ranking: covering almost 2 million square kilometers, Mexico is the fifth-largest country in the Americas by total area and the 14th largest in the world.
 10th most populous country
 Most populous Spanish-speaking country in the world
 Mexico is the 11th largest economy in the world by gross domestic product (GDP) by purchasing power parity
 ISO country codes: MX, MEX, 484
 ISO region codes: See ISO 3166-2:MX
 Internet country code top-level domain: .mx

Geography of Mexico 

Geography of Mexico
 Mexico is: a megadiverse country
 Location:
 Northern Hemisphere, Western Hemisphere
 Americas
 North America
 Middle America
 Time zones:
 Time Zone 1 – UTC-06, summer UTC-05
 Time Zone 2 – UTC-07, summer UTC-06
 Time Zone 3 – UTC-08, summer UTC-07
 Extreme points of Mexico
 High: Pico de Orizaba 
 Low: Laguna Salada 
 Land boundaries: 4,353 km
 3,141 km
 962 km
 250 km
 Coastline: 9,330 km
 Population of Mexico: 106,682,500 people (mid-2008 estimate) - 11th most populous country
 Area of Mexico:  - 15th largest country
 Atlas of Mexico

Environment of Mexico 

 Climate of Mexico
 Environmental issues in Mexico
 Green building in Mexico
 Ecoregions in Mexico
 Renewable energy in Mexico
 Geology of Mexico
 National parks of Mexico
 Protected areas of Mexico
 Wildlife of Mexico
 Fauna of Mexico
 Birds of Mexico
 Mammals of Mexico

Geographic features of Mexico 

 Baja California peninsula
 Yucatán peninsula

 Gulf Coast of Mexico
 Islands of Mexico
 Lakes of Mexico
 Mountain peaks of Mexico
 The 9 Highest mountain peaks of Mexico
 The 28 Most prominent mountain peaks of Mexico
 The 32 Most isolated mountain peaks of Mexico
 Volcanoes of Mexico
 Rivers of Mexico
 Waterfalls of Mexico
 Valleys of Mexico
 World Heritage Sites in Mexico

Ecoregions of Mexico 

List of ecoregions in Mexico
 Ecoregions in Mexico

Administrative divisions of Mexico 

Administrative divisions of Mexico
 States of Mexico
 Municipalities of Mexico
 Mexican Federal District (Mexico City)
 Boroughs of the Mexican Federal District

States of Mexico 

 Mexican states by area
 Mexican states by Human Development Index
 Mexican states by population
 Municipalities of Mexico

The United Mexican States is a federation comprising thirty-one states and a federal district (postal codes are in parentheses):

 Aguascalientes (Ags.)
 Baja California (BC)
 Baja California Sur (BCS)
 Chihuahua (Chih.)
 Colima (Col.)
 Campeche (Camp.)
 Coahuila (Coah.)
 Chiapas (Chis.)
 Distrito Federal (DF)
 Durango (Dgo.)
 Guerrero (Gro.)
 Guanajuato (Gto.)
 Hidalgo (Hgo.)
 Jalisco (Jal.)
 Michoacán (Mich.)
 Morelos (Mor.)
 México (Mex or Edomex)
 Nayarit (Nay.)
 Nuevo León (NL)
 Oaxaca (Oax.)
 Puebla (Pue.)
Quintana Roo (QR)
 Querétaro (Qro.)
 Sinaloa (Sin.)
San Luis Potosí (SLP)
Sonora (Son.)
Tabasco (Tab.)
Tlaxcala (Tlax.)
 Tamaulipas (Tamps.)
Veracruz (Ver.)
Yucatán (Yuc.)
Zacatecas (Zac.)

Mexican Federal District 
 Mexican Federal District (Mexico City)
 Boroughs of the Mexican Federal District
 Colonias of Mexico City

Municipalities of Mexico 

Municipalities of Mexico
 Cities of Mexico
 Capital: Mexico City (one of the world's most populous cities).

Demography of Mexico 

Demographics of Mexico
Mexican people
Immigration to Mexico

Government and politics of Mexico 

Politics of Mexico
 Form of government: federal presidential and congressional multi-party representative democratic republic
 Head of state: President of Mexico, Andrés Manuel López Obrador
 Head of government: President of Mexico, Andrés Manuel López Obrador
 Capital of Mexico: Mexico City
 Elections in Mexico
1988 - 1991 - 1994 - 1997 - 2000 - 2003 - 2004 - 2005 - 2006 - 2007 - 2008 - 2009 - 2012 - 2018
 Political parties in Mexico

Branches of the government of Mexico 

Government of Mexico

Executive branch of the government of Mexico 
 President of Mexico
 Mexican Executive Cabinet

Legislative branch of the government of Mexico 

 Congress of Mexico (bicameral)
 Upper house: Senate of Mexico
 Lower house: Chamber of Deputies of Mexico
 LXII Legislature of the Mexican Congress (62nd and current legislature)

Judicial branch of the government of Mexico 

Court system of Mexico
 Supreme Court of Justice of the Nation

Foreign relations of Mexico 

Foreign relations of Mexico
 United States-Mexico relations

International organization membership 
The United Mexican States is a member of:

Agency for the Prohibition of Nuclear Weapons in Latin America and the Caribbean (OPANAL)
Andean Community of Nations (CAN) (observer)
Asia-Pacific Economic Cooperation (APEC)
Bank for International Settlements (BIS)
Caribbean Community and Common Market (Caricom) (observer)
Caribbean Development Bank (CDB)
Central American Bank for Economic Integration (BCIE)
Central American Integration System (SICA) (observer)
Council of Europe (CE) (observer)
European Bank for Reconstruction and Development (EBRD)
Food and Agriculture Organization (FAO)
Group of Three (G3)
Group of 15 (G15)
Group of 24 (G24)
Group of Twenty Finance Ministers and Central Bank Governors (G20)
Inter-American Development Bank (IADB)
International Atomic Energy Agency (IAEA)
International Bank for Reconstruction and Development (IBRD)
International Chamber of Commerce (ICC)
International Civil Aviation Organization (ICAO)
International Criminal Court (ICCt)
International Criminal Police Organization (Interpol)
International Development Association (IDA)
International Federation of Red Cross and Red Crescent Societies (IFRCS)
International Finance Corporation (IFC)
International Fund for Agricultural Development (IFAD)
International Hydrographic Organization (IHO)
International Labour Organization (ILO)
International Maritime Organization (IMO)
International Mobile Satellite Organization (IMSO)
International Monetary Fund (IMF)
International Olympic Committee (IOC)
International Organization for Migration (IOM)
International Organization for Standardization (ISO)

International Red Cross and Red Crescent Movement (ICRM)
International Telecommunication Union (ITU)
International Telecommunications Satellite Organization (ITSO)
International Trade Union Confederation (ITUC)
Inter-Parliamentary Union (IPU)
Latin American Economic System (LAES)
Latin American Integration Association (LAIA)
Multilateral Investment Guarantee Agency (MIGA)
Nonaligned Movement (NAM) (observer)
North American Free Trade Agreement (NAFTA)
Nuclear Energy Agency (NEA)
Organisation for Economic Co-operation and Development (OECD)
Organisation for the Prohibition of Chemical Weapons (OPCW)
Organization of American States (OAS)
Permanent Court of Arbitration (PCA)
Rio Group (RG)
South American Community of Nations (CSN) (observer)
Unión Latina
United Nations (UN)
Union of South American Nations (UNASUR) (observer)
United Nations Conference on Trade and Development (UNCTAD)
United Nations Educational, Scientific, and Cultural Organization (UNESCO)
United Nations High Commissioner for Refugees (UNHCR)
United Nations Industrial Development Organization (UNIDO)
Universal Postal Union (UPU)
World Confederation of Labour (WCL)
World Customs Organization (WCO)
World Federation of Trade Unions (WFTU)
World Health Organization (WHO)
World Intellectual Property Organization (WIPO)
World Meteorological Organization (WMO)
World Tourism Organization (UNWTO)
World Trade Organization (WTO)

Law and order in Mexico 

Law of Mexico
 Capital punishment in Mexico
 Constitution of Mexico
 Crime in Mexico
 Human rights in Mexico
 Lesbian Groups in Mexico
 LGBT rights in Mexico
 Freedom of religion in Mexico
 Law enforcement in Mexico

Military of Mexico 

Military of Mexico
 Command
 Commander-in-chief: President of Mexico
 Secretariat of National Defense (directs only the Army, including Air Force)
 Secretary of the Navy (Mexico)
 Forces
 Army of Mexico
 Air Force of Mexico
 Navy of Mexico
 Fuerza Naval del Golfo (Naval Force of the Gulf)
 Fuerza Naval del Pacifico (Naval Force of the Pacific)
 Fuerza Aeronaval (Navy Air Force)
 Special forces of Mexico
 Mexican military ranks
 Military history of Mexico

Local government in Mexico 

 Local government in Mexico

History of Mexico 

History of Mexico
Timeline of the history of Mexico
Current events of Mexico
 Economic history of Mexico
 Military history of Mexico
 History of the flags of Mexico

Chronologically 
 Pre-Columbian Civilizations
 Olmec, Olmec influences on Mesoamerican cultures
 Teotihuacán
 Maya civilization
 Toltec
 Aztec civilization (Mexica), History of the Aztecs
 First Franco-Mexican War
 Spanish Conquest of Mexico
 New Spain
 Mexican War of Independence
 Independent Mexico
 La Reforma
 French intervention in Mexico
 Restored Republic
 Porfiriato
 Mexican Revolution
 Modern Mexico

Culture of Mexico 

Culture of Mexico

 Architecture of Mexico
 Cuisine of Mexico
 Festivals in Mexico
 Mexican handcrafts and folk art
 Healthcare in Mexico
 Languages of Mexico
 Media in Mexico
 National symbols of Mexico
 Coat of arms of Mexico
 Flag of Mexico
 National anthem of Mexico
 Prostitution in Mexico
 Public holidays in Mexico
 Records of Mexico
 Religion in Mexico
 Buddhism in Mexico
 Christianity in Mexico
 Hinduism in Mexico
 Islam in Mexico
 Judaism in Mexico
 Sikhism in Mexico
 World Heritage Sites in Mexico

Art in Mexico 
 Mexican art
 Cinema of Mexico
 Literature of Mexico
 Music of Mexico
List of music artists and bands from Mexico
List of Mexican composers of classical music
 Television in Mexico
 Theatre in Mexico

Sports in Mexico 

Sports in Mexico
 Football in Mexico

Economy and infrastructure of Mexico 

Economy of Mexico
 Economic rank: Mexico is the 12th largest economy in the world by gross domestic product (GDP) by purchasing power parity.
 Agriculture in Mexico
 Bank of Mexico (central bank)
 Communications in Mexico
 Internet in Mexico
 Companies of Mexico
 Currency of Mexico: Peso
ISO 4217: MXN
 Economic history of Mexico
 Energy in Mexico
 Petroleum industry in Mexico
 Health care in Mexico
 Mining in Mexico
 North American Free Trade Agreement - Mexico's economy is strongly linked to those of its NAFTA partners.
 Mexican Stock Exchange
 Tourism in Mexico
 Transport in Mexico
 Airports in Mexico
 Highway system of Mexico
 Rail transport in Mexico
 Seaports in Mexico
 Water supply and sanitation in Mexico

Education in Mexico 

Education in Mexico

See also 

Mexico
Index of Mexico-related articles

List of international rankings
List of Mexico-related topics
Lists of country-related topics
Topic outline of geography
Topic outline of North America
United Nations

References

External links 

 
 

 
 
Mexico